Barrington River, a perennial river of the Manning River catchment, is located in the Upper Hunter district of New South Wales, Australia.

Course and features
Barrington River rises below Carey's Peak, within Barrington Volcano, on the eastern slopes of the Mt Royal Range, within the Great Dividing Range, and flows generally east, joined by five tributaries including the Kerripit, Cobark, and Moppy rivers, before reaching its confluence with the Gloucester River, near Gloucester. The river descends  over its  course.

The river was named in honour of Lord Barrington.

The river is popular with kayakers and canoers due to its sections of white water and attractive scenery, and flows through the Barrington Tops National Park.

See also 

 Rivers of New South Wales
 List of rivers of New South Wales (A–K)
 List of rivers of Australia

References

External links
 

Dungog Shire
Rivers of the Hunter Region
Mid North Coast